Chak Kazi Barrpura (also spelled as 'Barrpura', 'Barrapura', 'Chak Qazi',Chak Kazi or 'Chak Kaji') is a small village about 12 km from Bharatpur, India in Rajasthan state. This village is located beside the  Keoladeo National Park (KNP) in south-west side of its boundary.

Social and Developmental Canvas

Most of villagers are farmers. Based on census of India 2001, there are 124 families in the village and the population is 830. Male population is 446 and female population is 384 (sex ratio = 1000:860).Total agriculture labor is 97 and working population is 170. Total literacy is 56 percent. Male literacy is 67 percent. Female literacy is 43 percent.

There are all Jatav families including one mehtar family in the village. All the people belong to Scheduled caste (SC), a socially backward class mentioned in Constitution of India.

2001 Census report of village

source:

Geography
The Address of village is : Village-Barrpura, Post- Aghapur, District- Bharatpur - 321001 (Rajasthan).

The neighboring villages are: Aghapur, Darapur kala, Darapur Khurd, Nagla Banjara, Chak Naswaria, Nagla Bajho, Chak New, Nagla Punjabi, Kalyanpur, Chak Chaube, Chaukipura, Kaproli. Ajan dam is located near these villages.

History
The people of this village came from three villages: Veerampura, Ghughupura and Bilothi in about 1960. Half part of the village (by population as well as residence area) is formed by the people came from Veerampura and another half is formed by the people came from Ghughupura and Bilothi, making each half of it.

Economy
Residents depend on agriculture economically. Due to poor condition of agriculture in India, they are economically backward, as like other villages in India. Few people are also in other government and private sectors.

Education
There is one government primary school in the village. The students of the village have to go another village after fifth class for further reading. Even male child education is not satisfactory, the condition of girl child education is poorer. There is only one government primary school in the village.

References

External links
Chak Kazi village- Social and developmental canvas
Rajiv Gandhi Gramin Vidyutikaran Yojana - Progress of Village Electrification

Villages in Bharatpur district